Colette Burgeon (born 11 February 1957 in Hainaut, Belgium) is a Belgian politician and member of the Parti Socialiste.

Career
Burgeon served from 1985 to 1995 on the Walloon Regional Council. She was a member of the Chamber of Representatives from 1985 to 1995 for Soignies, from 1995 to 2003 for Mons-Soignies, and from 2003 to 2014 for Hainaut. Burgeon was the Second Vice-President of the Chamber from 2007 to 2010, and has also been the commissioner for gender equality in the Belgian Parliament.

References

1957 births
Living people
People from Manage, Belgium
Socialist Party (Belgium) politicians
Members of the Parliament of Wallonia
Members of the Chamber of Representatives (Belgium)
20th-century Belgian women politicians
20th-century Belgian politicians
21st-century Belgian women politicians
21st-century Belgian politicians